The 2000 FIBA Europe Under-20 Championship (known at that time as 2000 European Championship for Young Men) was the fifth edition of the FIBA Europe Under-20 Championship. The city of Ohrid, hosted the tournament. Slovenia won their first title.

Teams

Squads

Qualification

Preliminary round
The twelve teams were allocated in two groups of six teams each.

Group A

Group B

Knockout stage

9th–12th playoffs

Championship

5th–8th playoffs

Final standings

References
FIBA Archive
FIBA Europe Archive

FIBA U20 European Championship
2000–01 in European basketball
2000–01 in Republic of Macedonia basketball
International youth basketball competitions hosted by North Macedonia
Sport in Ohrid